Andria Urushadze (born April 25, 1968) is a Georgian politician who served as the Minister of Health, Labour and Social Affairs  of Georgia from September 10, 2010, to March 15, 2012.

Early years
Urushadze was born on April 25, 1968, in Tbilisi, Georgia. In 1993, he graduated from the General Medicine Department of Tbilisi State Medical University. In 1993–1994, he took post graduate courses in Endocrinology at the same institution. In 1997, he completed studies at the School of Governance. He then completed Special Training Course for Executive Managers of Insurance Companies in Switzerland in 1998. From 1993 through 1995, he was the Vice-President of Georgian Youth International Foundation. In 1995–1997, Urushadze was the head of the International Programs Implementation Bureau at the State Chancellery of Georgia. From 1997 until 2005, he was the Executive Director of Insurance Company Aldagi.

Political career
In September 2005, Urushadze was appointed head of the Healthcare Department at the Ministry of Labor, Health and Social Affairs of Georgia. In October 2006, he became  Health Policy Expert for the same ministry as per contracts signed with the World Health Organization and the World Bank. In October 2007, he was appointed Director of the Social Service Agency of Georgia. On August 13, 2010, he was nominated as Minister of Labor, Health and Social Affairs of Georgia and, on September 10, 2012, he assumed the office. On March 15, 2012, he was appointed as deputy mayor of Tbilisi in charge of social issues, being succeeded on his ministerial position by Zurab Tchiaberashvili.

Urushadze has authored scientific publications, including "Key Principles of Georgian Health and Social Policy".
In addition to native Georgian, he speaks English and Russian. He's married and has two children.

See also 
List of Georgians
Cabinet of Georgia

References

1968 births
Living people
Politicians from Tbilisi
Government ministers of Georgia (country)
Tbilisi State Medical University alumni